Anne de Laval (1385 – 25 January 1466) was a French noblewoman. She was the ruling Dame/Seigneur de Laval in 1414–1429. 

She was the daughter of Jeanne de Laval-Tinténiac and her second husband  (died 1412), governor of Brittany and baron of Laval (Jeanne's first husband had been Bertrand du Guesclin).

Titles 
She was the hereditary dame of Laval, hereditary baronne of Vitré, hereditary countess of Rennes, of Châtillon, of Gavre, of Acquigny, of Aubigné, Courbeveille, hereditary dame of Tinténiac, of Bécherel and of Romillé. She inherited all these titles from the successive accidental deaths of her two brothers, Guy and Francois.

Family 
On 22 January 1404, as daughter and sole heir of Guy XII de Laval, she married Jean de Montfort, lord of Montfort and of Kergolay, and from them were descended several bishops and the greatest lords of Brittany. 

One of the conditions of the marriage was that any children born to it would bear the name and arms of Laval.  (The same condition had already been applied to the marriage of Emma de Laval with Mathieu II de Montmorency.)  Nevertheless, Jean de Montfort renounced the name and title he had been born with to take up the name of Guy XIII de Laval, better to associate himself with his wife Anne's power.  Guy and Anne had 5 children:

 Guy XIV de Laval,
 André de Lohéac,
 Louis de Laval,
 Jeanne de Laval (Dame de Campzillon), who in 1424 married Louis I de Bourbon-Vendôme
 Catherine de Laval (Dame de Chauvigny) who married Guy de Chauvigny vicomte de Brosse

References

Sources

1385 births
1466 deaths
French suo jure nobility
French baronesses
Anne 
15th-century women rulers
15th-century French people
15th-century French women
14th-century French people
14th-century French women